The United Nations Security Council Resolution 2209 condemns any use of chemicals as a weapon in the Syrian Civil War and threatens to use force if chemical weapons are used again in the conflict. The resolution was passed with 14 in favor with one abstention from Venezuela.

References

External links
Text of the Resolution at undocs.org

 2209
 2209
2015 in Syria
March 2015 events